Hon. William Feilding (1669–1723), of Ashtead, Surrey and Duke Street, Westminster, was an English Whig politician who sat in the English House of Commons from 1705 to 1708 and in the British House of Commons from 1708 to 1723.

Feilding was the second son of William Feilding, 3rd Earl of Denbigh and his wife Mary King, daughter  of Sir Robert King of Boyle Abbey, county Roscommon. He matriculated at Queen's College, Oxford on 4 May 1686, aged 16. He was Lieutenant of the Yeomen of the Guard from 1704 to 1708. In December 1705, he made an advantageous marriage to Lady Diana Howard, widow of Thomas Howard, MP of Ashtead, Surrey, and daughter of Francis Newport, 1st Earl of Bradford. She was wealthy and had a parliamentary seat at her disposal.
 
Feilding was returned unopposed as Member (MP) for Castle Rising at a by-election on  29 November 1705. He was returned in 1708, 1710, 1713, 1715 and 1722. He was appointed clerk comptroller of the Green Cloth for life in 1716.

Feilding died at Epsom on 21 September 1723 and was buried at Ashtead. He and his wife had no children.

References

1669 births
1723 deaths
18th-century English people
People from Surrey (before 1889)
People from Westminster
Members of the Parliament of Great Britain for English constituencies
English MPs 1705–1707
British MPs 1707–1708
British MPs 1708–1710
British MPs 1710–1713
British MPs 1713–1715
British MPs 1715–1722
British MPs 1722–1727